The Deceivers is a 1988 adventure film directed by Nicholas Meyer, starring Pierce Brosnan, Shashi Kapoor and Saeed Jaffrey. The film is based on the 1952 John Masters novel of the same name regarding the murderous Thuggee of India.

Plot
The film takes place in India in 1825. The country is being ravaged by Thuggees, a Kali-worshiping cult also known as "Deceivers", who commit robbery and ritualistic murder. Captain William Savage, an honorable district administrator for the East India Company, is informed by his subjects in Madhia about the Thugees' murder raids, and appalled, he opens a manhunt on them. He manages to capture a Thugee named Hussein and win his cooperation, but for acting on his own initiative, Savage's chief officer and father-in-law, Colonel Wilson, stubbornly adhering to Company protocol, dismisses his report and relieves him of his duty.

Chagrined but determined, Savage decides to disguise himself as an imprisoned native outlaw, Gopal the Weaver, and get introduced into the Thugee cult by Hussein, with only his wife Sarah knowing about his plan. He is accepted, and after a period of training he is forced to participate in their raids. One day, however, Gopal appears at the fortress, revealing himself as a Thuggee, and in order to avoid being exposed, Savage is forced to kill him. This awakens in him a dark, ecstatic fascination for killing. Savage also discovers that certain East Indian Company officials know about the Thuggees' activities but let them pass through their districts in exchange for a share of their ill-gotten plunder.

Fearing for Savage's safety, Hussein flees to inform Sarah of her husband's situation; but Thuggee infiltrators in the Company overhear them and capture Hussein before he can return to the fortress. With Savage's secret thus exposed, but with the Thuggees willing to accept him as one of their own, Savage is instructed to kill Hussein. Taking one of the Thuggees' children hostage, he forces his way out of the fortress, but Hussein is shot dead before he can get away. Savage flees into a field of reeds, where the Thuggees encircle him; but before they can kill him, East India Company troopers, alerted by Sarah's servant, arrive and defeat the Thuggees. Rehabilitated and promoted to colonel, Savage receives the official task of eradicating the Thuggee cult throughout India, although Savage must now struggle with the mental scars his time with the Thuggees and their bloodthirsty ways have left on him.

Cast

Pierce Brosnan as William Savage 
Shashi Kapoor as Chandra Singh
Saeed Jaffrey as Hussein 
Shanmukha Srinivas as Hira Lal
Helena Michell as Sarah Wilson 
Keith Michell as Colonel Wilson 
David Robb as George Anglesmith 
Tariq Yunus as Feringea 
Jalal Agha as the Nawab
Manmohan Krishna as Old Rajput
Ramesh Ranga as Rajput's Son
Gary Cady as Lt. Maunsell
Salim Ghouse as Piroo 
Neena Gupta as Gopal's Wife/the Widow
Kanwaljit Singh as Gopal
Nayeem Hafizka as Sepoy
Bijoya Jena as Harlot 
H.N. Kalla as The Nawab's Servant 
Rajesh Vivek as Priest
Kammo as Official

Original Novel
John Masters' original novel was published in 1952. It was his second novel, following Nightrunners to Bengal.

"It offers color and violence in large gobs" said the Washington Post. The New York Times called it "an unfocused work that never comes to grips with its material."

The novel was adapted for radio by the BBC in 1984.

Production

Development
In 1957 it was announced John Bryan would produce a film of the novel for the Rank Organization with Masters writing the screenplay. The film was not made. In 1974 Stanley Donen announced he had the rights and wanted to make "the kind of movie I've never made before – a big sprawling epic." He did not make it either.

Film rights passed to Merchant Ivory Productions. "It's completely different for us", said producer Ismail Merchant. "We're known for doing E.M. Forster and Henry James. Deceivers is in the same genre as Raiders of the Lost Ark. Which is certainly a switch." Merchant later said he made it to "keep the production company moving". In 1984 Michael White was reportedly working on the film.

Development took ten years. Original directors were Marek Kanievska and Stephen Frears. Then Merchant approached writer and director Nicholas Meyer—fresh off his work on Volunteers and Star Trek IV: The Voyage Home—through Meyer's agent about directing The Deceivers.  Meyer reportedly agreed to a substantial pay cut in order to direct the film, remarking, "Hollywood is making films I have no interest in seeing, machined tooled, packaged, with a lot of numbers after their names.  The studios don't just want home runs.  They want grand slams.  Anything less than $100 million is not interesting to them." "It's strictly action-adventure = a 'cavalry to the rescue' type film", said Meyer.

Casting
Christopher Reeve and Treat Williams were originally considered for the part of William Savage, but Meyer successfully lobbied to have an actual Englishman in the role.  In his memoir The View from the Bridge, Meyer wrote, "'Here's a story about an Englishman who disguises himself as an Indian,' I reasoned. 'If you cast this actor, you will have an American disguising himself as an Englishman, disguising himself as an Indian.  We will be lost in the stunt, even if he pulls it off, and not pay attention to the story and the things we want to take for granted, i.e., that it concerns an Englishman.'"

The part ultimately went to Pierce Brosnan, whom Meyer fondly described as "Errol Flynn—with talent." Brosnan had just missed the chance to play James Bond due to his commitments to Remington Steele. His casting was announced in April 1987. "I play an Englishman, a glorified accountant working for the East India Trading Co.", said Brosnan. "He discovers this cult and disguises himself as an Indian. He goes on the road with the Thugs, who kill people by strangulation."

Filming
Shooting took place over a four-month period in India, in Jaipur, Agra and Khajuraho, while post-production was completed in London. Filming started 21 September 1987.

Filming was marred with difficulties from the onset.  According to Meyer, the production was subject to frequent disruption from the local Jaipur mafia for declining to make any dealings with their leader. Meyer wrote, "Scores of hooligans stormed through our sets while we were rolling; equipment was sabotaged or stolen; 'cultural' societies were founded for the sole purpose of suing us, alleging pornographic distortions of Indian culture."

The filmmakers were criticised by social and political groups who felt it distorted Hindu religion and culture. The producers argued it was "a pure and simple thriller".

At one point, Ismail Merchant and co-producer Tim Van Rellim were arrested for "obscenity and misrepresentation of Hindu culture."  Among the allegations was that the production filmed a sati as one really happened. Merchant responded to the allegations with disgust, saying, "What happened was a mockery—people taking advantage of democratic principles in order to whip up a frenzy."

Associate producer Paul Bradley said the charge came from a politically well-connected Jaipur businessman who was unhappy at the depiction of Kali and the subplot about suttee. "The script has already been submitted to and passed by the Indian government", said Bradley. "Any film made in India, certainly by a foreign company, has to be vetted and passed by the Ministry of Information and Broadcasting." Bradley said the businessman and some film workers had been "pressuring the production company to employ them at exorbitant rates."

Despite the disruptions, Meyer spoke highly of his Indian production crew, stating, "One day when we needed our tulip crane for a big shot, I was flummoxed to learn that four of its bolts had been stolen, incapacitating a vital piece of equipment. I don't deal well with last minute alterations to The Plan, but my Indian crew managed to mill four new bolts by the time we were ready to roll."

Reception

Box office
The Deceivers was a box office failure. The film earned only $346,297 in the North American market against an estimated $5–6 million budget.

Critical response
The Deceivers was released on 2 September 1988 and received mostly negative reviews from film critics. The film has a 33% rating on Rotten Tomatoes based on 6 reviews.

Roger Ebert of the Chicago Sun-Times gave the film a mediocre review and stated that, "Despite the film's claims to be based on fact, I didn't believe it for a moment. I did, however, enjoy it at various moments. Brosnan disappears so completely into the leading role that he hardly seems present in the movie, and the film's portrait of Victorian India is a triumph (the production was designed by the British master of period atmosphere, Tony Adams). It looks great even at its most incredible."  Janet Maslin of The New York Times also thought negatively of the film, stating "The tinniness of Michael Hirst's screenplay (It's older than time and just as mysterious) hardly helps bring this material to life, any more than Mr. Brosnan's unconvincing and (despite several episodes in which he proves himself capable of violent killing) rather passive performance." Maslin then went on to say that, "In its own way, The Deceivers is oddly old-fashioned."  Hal Hinson of The Washington Post called it "an adventure epic with a pretty measly sense of adventure."  He added, "There are a few patches of exotic fun, like the opening murder scene, and there's a seductive campfire dance by a young boy that's creepy enough to send chills (though perhaps inadvertently). But for the most part all we react to is the squandering of a good idea."

Conversely, Jay Boyar of the Orlando Sentinel gave the film modest praise, saying it "casts quite a spell, combining supernatural overtones with scenes of shootings, stabbings and (especially) strangulations. Without being crude or exploitative it tells its story in a modest, old-fashioned way with no reliance on gratuitous gore."

Home media
The Deceivers was released on DVD through The Criterion Collection.

See also
List of historical drama films of Asia

References

External links

The Deceivers at TCMDB

1988 films
Films based on British novels
Films directed by Nicholas Meyer
Films scored by John Scott (composer)
1980s adventure films
Merchant Ivory Productions films
Films set in 1825
Films set in India
Films set in the British Raj
Films shot in Rajasthan
Films about cults
Films shot in Uttar Pradesh
1980s English-language films